John James Morrow (born 20 November 1971) is a Northern Irish former footballer who played as a forward. Born in Belfast, he played professionally for Linfield, Rangers, Oldham Athletic and Greenock Morton. He also had a trial at Manchester United in October 1987, shortly before his 16th birthday.

References

External links

John Morrow, Post War English & Scottish Football League A - Z Player's Transfer Database

1971 births
Living people
Association footballers from Belfast
Association footballers from Northern Ireland
Association football forwards
Greenock Morton F.C. players
Rangers F.C. players
Oldham Athletic A.F.C. players
Linfield F.C. players
Scottish Football League players
English Football League players
Northern Ireland youth international footballers
Northern Ireland B international footballers